Juneteenth is a federal holiday in the United States commemorating the emancipation of enslaved African Americans. Deriving its name from combining "June" and "nineteenth", it is celebrated on the anniversary of General Order No. 3, issued by Major General Gordon Granger on June 19, 1865, proclaiming freedom for slaves in Texas.  Originating in Galveston, Juneteenth has since been observed annually in various parts of the United States, often broadly celebrating African-American culture. The day was first recognized as a federal holiday in 2021, when President Joe Biden signed the Juneteenth National Independence Day Act into law after the efforts of Lula Briggs Galloway, Opal Lee, and others.

Early celebrations date to 1866, at first involving church-centered community gatherings in Texas. They spread across the South and became more commercialized in the 1920s and 1930s, often centering on a food festival. Participants in the Great Migration brought these celebrations to the rest of the country. During the Civil Rights Movement of the 1960s, these celebrations were eclipsed by the nonviolent determination to achieve civil rights, but grew in popularity again in the 1970s with a focus on African American freedom and African-American arts. Beginning with Texas by proclamation in 1938, and by legislation in 1979, every U.S. state and the District of Columbia has formally recognized the holiday in some way.  With its adoption in parts of Mexico, the holiday has become an international holiday. Juneteenth is celebrated by the Mascogos, descendants of Black Seminoles who escaped from slavery in 1852 and settled in Coahuila, Mexico.

Celebratory traditions often include public readings of the Emancipation Proclamation, singing traditional songs such as "Swing Low, Sweet Chariot" and "Lift Every Voice and Sing", and the reading of works by noted African-American writers, such as Ralph Ellison and Maya Angelou. Juneteenth celebrations may also include rodeos, street fairs, cookouts, family reunions, parties, historical reenactments, and Miss Juneteenth contests. In 2021, Juneteenth became the first new federal holiday since Martin Luther King Jr. Day was adopted in 1983.

Celebrations and traditions

The holiday is considered the "longest-running African-American holiday" and has been called "America's second Independence Day". Juneteenth is usually celebrated on the third Saturday in June. Historian Mitch Kachun considers that celebrations of the end of slavery have three goals: "to celebrate, to educate, and to agitate". Early celebrations consisted of baseball, fishing, and rodeos. African Americans were often prohibited from using public facilities for their celebrations, so they were often held at churches or near water. Celebrations were also characterized by elaborate large meals and people wearing their best clothing. It was common for former slaves and their descendants to make a pilgrimage to Galveston. As early festivals received news coverage, Janice Hume and Noah Arceneaux consider that they "served to assimilate African-American memories within the dominant 'American story'".

Observance today is primarily in local celebrations. In many places, Juneteenth has become a multicultural holiday. Traditions include public readings of the Emancipation Proclamation, singing traditional songs such as "Swing Low, Sweet Chariot" and "Lift Every Voice and Sing", and reading of works by noted African-American writers, such as Ralph Ellison and Maya Angelou. Celebrations include picnics, rodeos, street fairs, cookouts, family reunions, park parties, historical reenactments, blues festivals and Miss Juneteenth contests. Red food and drinks are traditional during the celebrations, including red velvet cake and strawberry soda, with red meant to represent resilience and joy. The Mascogos, the descendants of Black Seminoles who have resided in Coahuila since 1852, also celebrate Juneteenth.

Juneteenth celebrations often include lectures and exhibitions on African-American culture. The modern holiday places much emphasis upon teaching about African-American heritage. Karen M. Thomas wrote in Emerge that "community leaders have latched on to [Juneteenth] to help instill a sense of heritage and pride in black youth". Celebrations are commonly accompanied by voter registration efforts, the performing of plays, and retelling stories. The holiday is also a celebration of soul food and other food with African-American influences. In Tourism Review International, Anne Donovan and Karen DeBres write that "Barbecue is the centerpiece of most Juneteenth celebrations".

History
President Abraham Lincoln issued the Emancipation Proclamation on January 1, 1863, freeing the slaves in Texas and all the rebellious parts of Southern secessionist states of the Confederacy. Enforcement of the Proclamation generally relied upon the advance of Union troops. Texas, as the most remote state of the former Confederacy, had seen an expansion of slavery and had a low presence of Union troops as the American Civil War ended; thus, enforcement there had been slow and inconsistent prior to Granger's order.  Although the Emancipation Proclamation declared an end to slavery in the Confederate States, it did not end slavery in states that remained in the Union. For a short while after the fall of the Confederacy, slavery remained legal in two of the Union border statesDelaware and Kentucky. Those slaves were freed with the ratification of the Thirteenth Amendment to the Constitution, which abolished chattel slavery nationwide on December 6, 1865. The last slaves present in the continental United States were freed when those held by the Choctaw, who had sided with the Confederacy, were released in 1866.

Early history

The Civil War and celebrations of emancipation 

During the American Civil War (1861–1865), emancipation came at different times in different parts of the Southern United States. Large celebrations of emancipation, often called Jubilees (recalling the biblical Jubilee, in which slaves were freed), took place on September 22, January 1, July 4, August 1, April 6, and November 1, among other dates. When emancipation finally came to Texas, on June 19, 1865, as the southern rebellion collapsed, celebration was widespread. While that date did not actually mark the unequivocal end of slavery, even in Texas, and emancipation has been celebrated on other dates, June 19 came to be a day of shared commemoration across the United Statescreated, preserved, and spread by ordinary African Americansof slavery's wartime demise.

End of slavery in Texas 

Lincoln issued the preliminary Emancipation Proclamation in the midst of the Civil War on September 22, 1862, declaring that if the rebels did not end the fighting and rejoin the Union, all slaves in the Confederacy would be freed on the first day of the following year. On January 1, 1863, Lincoln issued the final Emancipation Proclamation, declaring that all slaves in the Confederate States of America in rebellion and not in Union hands were freed.

More isolated geographically, planters and other slaveholders had migrated into Texas from eastern states to escape the fighting, and many brought slaves with them, increasing by the thousands the enslaved population in the state at the end of the Civil War. Although most lived in rural areas, more than 1,000 resided in both Galveston and Houston by 1860, with several hundred in other large towns. By 1865, there were an estimated 250,000 slaves in Texas.

Despite the surrender of Confederate General-in-Chief Robert E. Lee at Appomattox Court House on April 9, 1865, the western Confederate Army of the Trans-Mississippi did not surrender until June 2. On the morning of June 19, 1865, Union Major General Gordon Granger arrived on the island of Galveston to take command of the more than 2,000 federal troops recently landed in the department of Texas to enforce the emancipation of its slaves and oversee Reconstruction, nullifying all laws passed within Texas during the war by Confederate lawmakers. The order informed all Texans that, in accordance with a Proclamation from the Executive of the United States, all slaves were free:

Longstanding urban legend places the historic reading of General Order No. 3 at Ashton Villa; however, no extant historical evidence supports such claims. Although widely believed, it is unlikely that Granger or his troops proclaimed the Ordinance by reading it aloud: it is more likely that copies of the Ordinance were posted in public places, including the Negro Church on Broadway, since renamed Reedy Chapel A.M.E. Church. On June 21, 2014, the Galveston Historical Foundation and Texas Historical Commission erected a Juneteenth plaque where the Osterman Building once stood signifying the location of Major General Granger's Union Headquarters and subsequent issuance of his general orders.

Although this event has come to be celebrated as the end of slavery, emancipation for the remaining enslaved in two Union border states (Delaware and Kentucky), would not come until several months later, on December 18, 1865, when the Thirteenth Amendment was ratified. The freedom of former slaves in Texas was given state law status in a series of Texas Supreme Court decisions between 1868 and 1874.

Early Juneteenth celebrations 

Former slaves in Galveston rejoiced after General Order No. 3. One year later, on June 19, 1866, freedmen in Texas organized the first of what became annual commemorations of "Jubilee Day". Early celebrations were used as political rallies to give voting instructions to newly freed African Americans. Other independence observances occurred on January 1 or 4.

In some cities, black people were barred from using public parks because of state-sponsored segregation of facilities. Across parts of Texas, freed people pooled their funds to purchase land to hold their celebrations. The day was first celebrated in Austin in 1867 under the auspices of the Freedmen's Bureau, and it had been listed on a "calendar of public events" by 1872. The observation was soon drawing thousands of attendees across Texas; in Limestone County, an estimated 30,000 black people celebrated at Booker T. Washington Park, established in 1898 for Juneteenth celebrations. The Black community began using the word Juneteenth for Jubilee Day early in the 1890s. The Current Issue, a Texas periodical, used the word as early as 1909, and that year a book on San Antonio remarked, with condescension, on "June 'teenth'".

Decline during Jim Crow

In the early 20th century, economic and political forces led to a decline in Juneteenth celebrations. From 1890 to 1908, Texas and all former Confederate states passed new constitutions or amendments that effectively disenfranchised black people, excluding them from the political process. White-dominated state legislatures passed Jim Crow laws imposing second-class status. Gladys L. Knight writes the decline in celebration was in part because "upwardly mobile blacks ... were ashamed of their slave past and aspired to assimilate into mainstream culture. Younger generations of blacks, becoming further removed from slavery were occupied with school ... and other pursuits." Others who migrated to the Northern United States could not take time off or simply dropped the celebration.

The Great Depression forced many black people off farms and into the cities to find work, where they had difficulty taking the day off to celebrate. From 1936 to 1951, the Texas State Fair served as a destination for celebrating the holiday, contributing to its revival. In 1936, an estimated 150,000 to 200,000 people joined the holiday's celebration in Dallas. In 1938, Governor of Texas James Allred issued a proclamation stating in part:

Seventy thousand people attended a "Juneteenth Jamboree" in 1951. From 1940 through 1970, in the second wave of the Great Migration, more than five million black people left Texas, Louisiana and other parts of the South for the North and the West Coast. As historian Isabel Wilkerson writes, "The people from Texas took Juneteenth Day to Los Angeles, Oakland, Seattle, and other places they went." In 1945, Juneteenth was introduced in San Francisco by a migrant from Texas, Wesley Johnson.

During the 1950s and 1960s, the Civil Rights Movement focused the attention of African Americans on expanding freedom and integrating. As a result, observations of the holiday declined again, though it was still celebrated in Texas.

Revival

1960s–1980s

Juneteenth soon saw a revival as black people began tying their struggle to that of ending slavery. In Atlanta, some campaigners for equality wore Juneteenth buttons. During the 1968 Poor People's Campaign to Washington, DC, called by Rev. Ralph Abernathy, the Southern Christian Leadership Conference made June 19 the "Solidarity Day of the Poor People’s Campaign". In the subsequent revival, large celebrations in Minneapolis and Milwaukee emerged,  as well as across the Eastern United States. In 1974, Houston began holding large-scale celebrations again, and Fort Worth, Texas, followed the next year. Around 30,000 people attended festivities at Sycamore Park in Fort Worth the following year. The 1978 Milwaukee celebration was described as drawing over 100,000 attendees. In 1979, the Texas Legislature made the occasion a state holiday. In the late 1980s, there were major celebrations of Juneteenth in California, Wisconsin, Illinois, Georgia, and Washington, D.C.

Prayer breakfast and commemorative celebrations

In 1979, Democratic State Representative Al Edwards of Houston successfully sponsored legislation to make Juneteenth a paid Texas state holiday. The same year, he hosted the inaugural Al Edwards prayer breakfast and commemorative celebration on the grounds of the 1859 home, Ashton Villa. As one of the few existing buildings from the Civil War era and popular in local myth and legend as the location of Major General Granger’s order, Edwards's annual celebration includes a local historian dressed as the Union general reading General Order No. 3 from the second story balcony of the home. The Emancipation Proclamation is also read and speeches are made. Representative Al Edwards died of natural causes April 29, 2020, at the age of 83, but the annual prayer breakfast and commemorative celebration continued at Ashton Villa, with the late legislator's son Jason Edwards speaking in his father’s place.

Official statewide recognitions 
In the late 1970s, when the Texas Legislature declared Juneteenth a "holiday of significance ... particularly to the blacks of Texas," it became the first state to establish Juneteenth as a state holiday. The bill passed through the Texas Legislature in 1979 and was officially made a state holiday on January 1, 1980.  Before 2000, three more U.S. states officially observed the day, and over the next two decades it was recognized as an official observance in all states, except South Dakota, until becoming a federal holiday.

Juneteenth in pop culture and mass media 
Since the 1980s and 1990s, the holiday has been more widely celebrated among African-American communities and has seen increasing mainstream attention in the US. In 1991, there was an exhibition by the Anacostia Community Museum (part of the Smithsonian Institution) called "Juneteenth '91, Freedom Revisited." In 1994, a group of community leaders gathered at Christian Unity Baptist Church in New Orleans to work for greater national celebration of Juneteenth. Expatriates have celebrated it in cities abroad, such as Paris. Some US military bases in other countries sponsor celebrations, in addition to those of private groups. In 1999, Ralph Ellison's novel Juneteenth was published, increasing recognition of the holiday. By 2006, at least 200 cities celebrated the day.

In 1997, activist Ben Haith created the Juneteenth flag, which was further refined by illustrator Lisa Jeanne Graf. In 2000, the flag was first hoisted at the Roxbury Heritage State Park in Boston by Haith. The star at the center represents Texas and the extension of freedom for all African Americans throughout the whole nation. The burst around the star represents a nova and the red curve represents a horizon, standing for a new era for African Americans. The red, white, and blue colors represent the American flag, which shows that African Americans and their enslaved ancestors are Americans, and the national belief in liberty and justice for all citizens.

The holiday gained mainstream awareness outside African-American communities through depictions in entertainment media, such as episodes of TV series Atlanta (2016) and Black-ish (2017), the latter of which featured musical numbers about the holiday by Aloe Blacc, The Roots, and Fonzworth Bentley. In 2018, Apple added Juneteenth to its calendars in iOS under official U.S. holidays. Some private companies have adopted Juneteenth as a paid day off for employees, while others have officially marked the day in other ways, such as a moment of silence. In 2020, several American corporations and educational institutions, including Twitter, the National Football League, Nike, began treating Juneteenth as a company holiday, providing a paid day off to their workers, and Google Calendar added Juneteenth to its U.S. Holidays calendar. Also in 2020, a number of major universities formally recognized Juneteenth, either as a "day of reflection" or as a university holiday with paid time off for faculty and staff.

The 2020 mother-daughter film on the holiday's pageant culture, Miss Juneteenth, celebrates African-American women who are "determined to stand on their own," while a resourceful mother is "getting past a sexist tendency in her community to keep women in their place."

Becoming a federal holiday

In 1996, the first federal legislation to recognize "Juneteenth Independence Day" was introduced in the U.S. House of Representatives, H.J. Res. 195, sponsored by Barbara-Rose Collins (D-MI). In 1997, Congress recognized the day through Senate Joint Resolution 11 and House Joint Resolution 56. In 2013, the U.S. Senate passed Senate Resolution 175, acknowledging Lula Briggs Galloway (late president of the National Association of Juneteenth Lineage), who "successfully worked to bring national recognition to Juneteenth Independence Day", and the continued leadership of the National Juneteenth Observance Foundation.

In the 2000s and 2010s, activists continued a long process to push Congress towards official recognition of Juneteenth. Organizations such as the National Juneteenth Observance Foundation sought a Congressional designation of Juneteenth as a national day of observance. By 2016, 45 states were recognizing the occasion. That year, Opal Lee, often referred to as the "grandmother of Juneteenth", began a walk from Fort Worth, Texas to Washington D.C. to advocate for a federal holiday, When it was officially made a federal holiday on June 17, 2021, it became one of five date-specific federal holidays along with New Year's Day (January 1), Independence Day (July 4), Veterans Day (November 11), and Christmas Day (December 25). Juneteenth will coincide with Father's Day in 2033, 2039, 2044, and 2050. Juneteenth is the first new federal holiday since Martin Luther King Jr. Day was declared a holiday in 1986. Juneteenth also falls within the statutory Honor America Days period, which lasts for 21 days from Flag Day (June 14) to Independence Day (July 4).

Legal observance

State and local

Texas was the first state to recognize the date by enacted law, in 1980. By 2002, eight states officially recognized Juneteenth and four years later 15 states recognized the holiday. By 2008, just over half of the states recognized Juneteenth in some way. By 2019, 47 states and the District of Columbia recognized Juneteenth, although as of 2020 only Texas had adopted the holiday as a paid holiday for state employees.

In June 2019, Governor of Pennsylvania Tom Wolf recognized Juneteenth as a holiday in the state.  In the yearlong aftermath of the murder of George Floyd that occurred on May 25, 2020, nine states designated Juneteenth a paid holiday, including New York, Washington, and Virginia. In 2020, Massachusetts Governor Charlie Baker issued a proclamation that the day would be marked as "Juneteenth Independence Day". This followed the filing of bills by both the House and Senate to make Juneteenth a state holiday. Baker did not comment on these bills specifically, but promised to grant the observance of Juneteenth greater importance. On June 16, 2021, Illinois adopted a law changing its ceremonial holiday to a paid state holiday.

Some cities and counties have also recognized Juneteenth through proclamation. In 2020, Juneteenth was formally recognized by New York City (as an annual official city holiday and public school holiday, starting in 2021). Cook County, Illinois, adopted an ordinance to make Juneteenth a paid county holiday. The City and County of Honolulu recognizes it as an "annual day of honor and reflection", and Portland, Oregon (as a day of remembrance and action and a paid holiday for city employees).

North Dakota approved recognition of Juneteenth as a state recognized annual holiday on April 13, 2021, with Hawaii becoming the 49th state to recognize the holiday on June 16, 2021. On June 16, 2020 South Dakota Governor Kristi Noem proclaimed that the following June 19, 2020 was to be Juneteenth Day for that year only, spurning calls for it to be recognized annually, rather than just for 2020. In February 2022, South Dakota became the last state to recognize Juneteenth as an annual state holiday or observance. Its law provided for following the federal law even before it was official. On May 2, 2022, Colorado Governor Jared Polis signed a bill changing the state's ceremonial observance to a state holiday and it is now the 11th state holiday in Colorado.  As of July 1, 2022, 21 states and the District of Columbia have made Juneteenth a paid state holiday, with the remainder maintaining a ceremonial observance.

National

Juneteenth is a federal holiday in the United States. For decades, activists and congress members (led by many African Americans) proposed legislation, advocated for, and built support for state and national observances. During his campaign for president in June 2020, Joe Biden publicly celebrated the holiday. President Donald Trump, during his campaign for reelection, added making the day a national holiday part of his "Platinum Plan for Black America". Spurred on by the advocates and the Congressional Black Caucus, on June 15, 2021, the Senate unanimously passed the Juneteenth National Independence Day Act, establishing Juneteenth as a federal holiday; it subsequently passed through the House of Representatives by a 415–14 vote on June 16. President Joe Biden signed the bill on June 17, 2021, making Juneteenth the eleventh American federal holiday and the first to obtain legal observance as a federal holiday since Martin Luther King Jr. Day was designated in 1983. According to the bill, federal government employees will now get to take the day off every year on June 19, or should the date fall on a Saturday or Sunday, they will get the Friday or Monday closest to the Saturday or Sunday on which the date falls respectively.

See also

 Emancipation Day
 Emancipation Proclamation
 History of African Americans in Texas
 Independence Day (United States)
 Juneteenth flag
 List of African-American holidays
 Negro Election Day
 Miss Juneteenth
 Public holidays in the United States
 Serfs' Emancipation Day
 Slavery in the United States
 Thirteenth Amendment to the United States Constitution
 "What to the Slave Is the Fourth of July?"

Explanatory notes

Citations

General and cited references 
 
 Blanck, Emily. "Galveston on San Francisco Bay: Juneteenth in the Fillmore District, 1945–2016." Western Historical Quarterly 50.2 (2019): 85–112. Galveston on San Francisco Bay: Juneteenth in the Fillmore District, 1945–2016
 Cromartie, J. Vern. "Freedom Came at Different Times: A Comparative Analysis of Emancipation Day and Juneteenth Celebrations." NAAAS Conference Proceedings. National Association of African American Studies, (2014) online.
 Donovan, Anne, and Karen De Bres. "Foods of freedom: Juneteenth as a culinary tourist attraction." Tourism Review International 9.4 (2006): 379–389. link
 Gordon-Reed, Annette (2021). On Juneteenth, New York: Liveright Publishing Corporation. . 
 
 
 
 
 
 
 Turner, E. H. "Juneteenth: The Evolution of an Emancipation Celebration." European Contributions to American Studies. 65 (2006): 69–81.
 Wiggins Jr, William H. "They Closed the Town Up, Man! Reflections on the Civic and Political Dimensions of Juneteenth." in Celebration: Studies in Festivity and Ritual, ed. Victor Turner (1982): 284–295.

Further reading

External links

 Jennifer Schuessler, "Liberation as Death Sentence", The New York Times, June 11, 2012
 Berkeley Juneteenth Festival, 2014 celebration
 Juneteenth: Fact Sheet Congressional Research Service (updated July 1, 2022)
 Juneteenth in United States
 Juneteenth World Wide Celebration, website for 150th anniversary celebration
 Juneteenth Historical Marker, Juneteenth historical marker at 2201 Strand, Galveston, TX 77550
 2022 Holidays, United States Office of Personal Management

 
1866 establishments in Texas
Abolitionism in the United States
African-American culture
African-American events
African-American festivals
African-American history of Texas
African-American history between emancipation and the civil rights movement
African-American society
Articles containing video clips
Culture of Galveston, Texas
Emancipation day
Federal holidays in the United States
June observances
Post–civil rights era in African-American history
Recurring events established in 1866
Slavery in the United States
Texas in the American Civil War
Texas state holidays